Frederick Russell Crawford Jr. (born December 23, 1941) is a former American basketball player who played in the National Basketball Association (NBA). Crawford was drafted in the fourth round of the 1964 NBA draft by the New York Knicks. Previously, he had been drafted by the Knicks in the 1963 NBA draft. He eventually played with the Knicks in the NBA in 1967. The following year, he was sold to the Los Angeles Lakers. In 1969, he was again sold, this time to the Milwaukee Bucks. Later, Crawford was selected by the Buffalo Braves in the 1970 NBA Expansion Draft. He was traded to the Philadelphia 76ers later that year.

NBA career statistics

Regular season 

|-
| align="left" | 1966–67
| align="left" | New York
| 19 || - || 10.1 || .379 || - || .632 || 2.5 || 0.6 || - || - || 5.9
|-
| align="left" | 1967–68
| align="left" | New York
| 31 || - || 13.7 || .367 || - || .627 || 2.7 || 1.5 || - || - || 5.4
|-
| align="left" | 1967–68
| align="left" | Los Angeles
| 38 || - || 19.9 || .482 || - || .617 || 2.9 || 2.5 || - || - || 10.3
|-
| align="left" | 1968–69
| align="left" | Los Angeles
| 81 || - || 20.9 || .465 || - || .539 || 2.7 || 1.9 || - || - || 6.2
|-
| align="left" | 1969–70
| align="left" | Milwaukee
| 77 || - || 17.3 || .480 || - || .682 || 2.4 || 2.9 || - || - || 7.6
|-
| align="left" | 1970–71
| align="left" | Buffalo
| 15 || - || 13.5 || .340 || - || .615 || 2.3 || 1.6 || - || - || 5.9
|-
| align="left" | 1970–71
| align="left" | Philadelphia
| 36 || - || 12.5 || .423 || - || .444 || 1.9 || 1.5 || - || - || 5.0
|- class="sortbottom"
| style="text-align:center;" colspan="2"| Career
| 297 || - || 17.0 || .446 || - || .595 || 2.5 || 2.1 || - || - || 6.8
|}

Playoffs 

|-
| align="left" | 1966–67
| align="left" | New York
| 4 || - || 28.0 || .425 || - || .500 || 6.0 || 4.0 || - || - || 17.0
|-
| align="left" | 1967–68
| align="left" | Los Angeles
| 15 || - || 17.1 || .434 || - || .543 || 2.3 || 1.1 || - || - || 6.1
|-
| align="left" | 1968–69
| align="left" | Los Angeles
| 5 || - || 4.0 || .500 || - || .000 || 0.6 || 0.6 || - || - || 0.8
|-
| align="left" | 1969–70
| align="left" | Milwaukee
| 10 || - || 20.8 || .386 || - || .833 || 3.5 || 3.7 || - || - || 8.8
|-
| align="left" | 1970–71
| align="left" | Philadelphia
| 1 || - || 9.0 || .500 || - || .750 || 0.0 || 1.0 || - || - || 7.0
|- class="sortbottom"
| style="text-align:center;" colspan="2"| Career
| 35 || - || 17.3 || .417 || - || .632 || 2.8 || 2.1 || - || - || 7.4
|}

References 

1941 births
Living people
American men's basketball players
Basketball players from New York City
Buffalo Braves players
Los Angeles Lakers players
Milwaukee Bucks players
New York Knicks draft picks
New York Knicks players
Philadelphia 76ers players
Shooting guards
St. Bonaventure Bonnies men's basketball players
Wilmington Blue Bombers players